Jaren Kyei Merrell (born February 8, 1989), known professionally as Shea Couleé, is an American drag queen, musician, actor, podcaster, and fixture of the Chicago nightlife scene. Born in Warsaw, Indiana, they began their drag career in 2012. In 2017, Couleé achieved international fame after competing on season nine of RuPaul's Drag Race, placing in the top four. In 2020, Couleé won the fifth season of RuPaul's Drag Race All Stars. Couleé later returned to compete on the all-winners seventh season of RuPaul's Drag Race All Stars in 2022, once again placing in the top four.

In 2016, Couleé co-produced, directed, wrote, and starred in Lipstick City. In 2017, Couleé released their debut EP, Couleé-D, along with accompanying music videos. Since then, Couleé has continued their musical career, starred in their own web series, podcast, and has embarked on domestic and international tours, including Werq the World, Haters Roast, and A Drag Queen Christmas.

Early life and education
Merrell was born to Marilyn Elaine Merrell in Warsaw, Indiana and raised in Plainfield, Illinois. The youngest of five children, their mother was a minister.
They graduated with a degree in costume design from Columbia College Chicago in 2011. In their sophomore year, they were cast in Ten Square.
During their senior year at Columbia, they were the lead designer on Shakespeare's The Winter's Tale. Couleé has performed in theater since the age of nine.

Career

RuPaul's Drag Race

After auditioning five times, every year since they started doing drag Couleé became one of 14 queens to compete on the ninth season of RuPaul's Drag Race. After portraying Naomi Campbell in the Snatch Game challenge, Campbell tweeted Couleé in approval. Couleé won their first challenge in the fourth episode, alongside Sasha Velour. They again won the following episode, portraying Blac Chyna for "Kardashians: The Musical". Couleé won another challenge in the ninth episode, "Your Pilot's On Fire", again alongside Sasha Velour. In the following episode, "Makeover: Crew Better Work", Couleé lip synced for their life against Nina Bo'nina Brown, sending her home to Demi Lovato's "Cool for the Summer". Couleé won once again during the season's "Gayest Ball Ever", after creating a look inspired by the Village People's "construction worker".

In the season's penultimate episode, the final four queens wrote, recorded, danced, and performed a verse in RuPaul's "Category Is", choreographed by Todrick Hall. In a series first, all four queens ended up advancing to the finale. In the season finale, Couleé received a personalized video from Blac Chyna, whom Couleé had portrayed earlier in the "Reality Stars: The Rusical" challenge. In this finale, for the first time in Drag Race history, the final four queens all participated in a "lip sync for the crown". Couleé was selected to lipsync against Sasha Velour, to Whitney Houston's "So Emotional", but lost. They ultimately placed in joint third/fourth place. Couleé's loss was met with controversy, with many people claiming that Couleé should have won the crown. Couleé themself responded to the controversy, defending Velour's win, and saying "Ultimately Sasha was more successful than myself and the other girls." While on tour, Merrell and fellow Drag Race contestant Farrah Moan were harassed by a woman at a kebab shop in Newcastle in April 2018 who first yelled at and then tried to hit the off-duty queens. Since losing Season 9, Couleé has been requested by fans to compete on an All Star season.

On May 8, 2020, Couleé was announced as a contestant on the fifth series of RuPaul's Drag Race All Stars. They won the second episode, lipsyncing for their legacy against Lipsync Assassin Alyssa Edwards to The Pointer Sisters' Neutron Dance and winning, earning a $20,000 cash prize. Couleé won again during the Snatch Game of Love challenge on episode five, portraying Flavor Flav. They lipsynced against Vanessa Vanjie Mateo to Madonna's "Open Your Heart" and won. On the grand finale episode, Couleé, along with fellow finalists Jujubee and Miz Cracker, recorded, danced, and performed a verse in RuPaul's "Clapback", choreographed by Todrick Hall. After lipsyncing to Janelle Monae's "Make Me Feel", Couleé was announced as the winner of All Stars 5.

In April 2022, Couleé was announced as one of the eight returning winners that would be competing in seventh season of RuPaul's Drag Race All Stars, the first ever all-winners season of Drag Race. Throughout the competition, they won the first and eleventh challenges, and ultimately finished in 3rd/4th place.

Music and continued career
In 2016, Couleé was photographed for Glossed and Found magazine. In May 2017, Couleé performed as part of the Werq the World 2017 tour. Hosted by Bianca Del Rio and Michelle Visage, the tour featured drag queens Alaska Thunderfuck, Alyssa Edwards, Detox, Latrice Royale, and Violet Chachki. Couleé co-produced, directed, and starred in their own film Lipstick City in July 2017. Couleé also released three music videos to promote their debut EP, Couleé-D. They co-directed the music videos, and co-produced the EP. Azealia Banks and Couleé announced plans to release a studio collaboration. The collaboration never came intro fruition after Banks ghosted Couleé.

At one point, they were asked to perform as a dancer in a burlesque show "Jeezy's Juke Joint". After an email mishap, they ended up performing a solo act for the show, their first time in drag. They have performed at various venues in Chicago, including Roscoe's, Berlin, Double Door, and Hydrate. They also worked as a resident host at Smart Bar, and was a Co-Host for the Tony Soto Show. At one point, Couleé competed in Miss Roscoe's Pageant. 
Before doing drag full-time, Couleé also worked part-time as a sales associate and customer service representative for an adult store, Tulip. In April, Couleé was featured in Peppermint's Too Funky music video. In April 2018, Couleé premiered Call Me Couleé, a web series documenting their life post Drag Race. The series lasted six episodes, concluding on October 18, 2018. In September 2018, Couleé performed as a background dancer for Christina Aguilera for Opening Ceremony's Spring 2019 collection, alongside other Drag Race alumni. They were photographed with Farrah Moan for Manny MUA's Lunar Beauty palette.
In June 2018, Couleé and Drag Race alum Asia O'Hara and Monét X Change performed in The Vixen's Black Girl Magic, a drag show created to showcase the talent of black queens. In November, Couleé was featured as a part of Lush's "Merry DRAGMas" Campaign, alongside Detox and Kim Chi. In March 2019, they appeared in the music video for Iggy Azalea's "Sally Walker". The same month, they joined the Drag World UK lineup, which began touring in June.
In May, they were photographed with Farrah Moan and Violet Chachki for Huda Beauty's new Setting Spray.

On May 18, Couleé re-released their song "Creme Brulee" as well as an accompanying music video. The song is inspired by other female rappers such as Lil' Kim, Nicki Minaj, and Azealia Banks. The song was originally written in 2013 and was the first song Couleé ever wrote. Billboard named "Creme Brulee" as the best Drag Music Video of 2018. In September, Couleé released "Gasoline" a collaboration with Eddie Gessford, known professionally as GESS, who produced, co-wrote, and featured credit on the track. A month later in June, National Selfie Day, Couleé was featured in Shawn Hollenbach's track "Double Filter Face", along with an accompanying music video. On July 15, Couleé released "Rewind", a collaborative song with them and GESS. The following month, they released a music video for the song, directed by Sam Bailey. The song is about Couleé's former boyfriend who suffered from bipolar disorder and committed suicide.

Couleé was one of the Inspirations for Sina Grace's character of Shade, Marvel's first drag queen superhero. Couleé has embarked on several world tours following their success on Drag Race including headlining the "War on the Catwalk" and "A Drag Queen Christmas", among others. Couleé was added to the Drag Race "Haters Roast: The Shady Tour" comedy tour with other Drag Race alumni in 2019. They also headlined a one-woman show in 2019, entitled "Couleé With A 'C'". An autobiographical show, it combined song, story, and comedy, revolving around their upbringing and how they got into drag. Couleé's makeup and look transformations have been featured in publications such as Cosmopolitan.
In October, Couleé published their first article for Metro. In January 2020, Couleé attended the first ever RuPaul's DragCon UK. In March 2020, Couleé performed alongside fellow drag race alumni BeBe Zahara Benet, Bob The Drag Queen, Mo Heart, Peppermint, and The Vixen in the Nubia tour. The tour began its run with sold-out shows in New York City, and has plans to visit Los Angeles, as well as other major cities across the United States.

In May 2020, Couleé announced the release of Shea Coul-Alé, a beer in collaboration with DoStuff Media and Goose Island Brewery as a part of their Drag a Beer campaign. A portion of all the profits went to an organization that supports individuals within the LGBTQ community. The following year, they launched another limited-edition beer with Goose Island, Shea Coul-Alé: Royal Edition, with an updated flavor palate, as well as their own exclusive burger.

In October 2020, Couleé was featured on the cover of Out magazine, recreating Cindy Crawford and k.d. Lang's iconic Vanity Fair cover. Later that month, they were a featured performer in Rihanna's Savage X Fenty  Fashion Show Vol. 2. In November, Couleé was recognised with the GAY TIMES Honour for Drag Hero at the fourth annual GAY TIMES Honours. They also featured as one of the cover stars for the magazine's Honours edition. In May 2021, Couleé launched Wanna Be On Top?, a biweekly podcast themed around America's Next Top Model and discussing its impact on the art of drag. In an interview with The Advocate, Couleé announced that for the past three years, they have been working on an album.

Couleé currently has over 1.5 million Instagram followers and is one of the few black Drag Race queens to reach the milestone. In May 2021, they were signed to United Talent Agency. In June 2021, Couleé made a guest appearance in Dragging the Classics: The Brady Bunch, a RuPaul's Drag Race and The Brady Bunch crossover, where they played the role of Marcia Brady.

In August 2021, Couleé released "$100,000 bar", their own brand of bar soap in collaboration with The Quiet Girl Shoppe, a female, Black-owned business. Later that month, they were a featured performer and host in Klub Kids London Presents: NOIR: The Tour, where 25% of the proceeds from the production will be donated to the Black Lives Matter movement. In October, they performed with Heels of Hell through their eight-city Halloween tour.

In February 2022, Couleé collaborated with Green Monké to produce their own Cannabis-infused Soda drinks.

In August 2022, they were cast as an undisclosed role in the upcoming Marvel Cinematic Universe Disney+ television series Ironheart.

Activism

Couleé has said it is important to them to use their career in drag to inspire people. In an interview with Seattle Gay Scene, they said, "I would say the influence I would like to have on the queer community would be to inspire people—specifically queer POC—to feel comfortable in themselves and their identities, to understand that they're special, they're amazing, and that anything you want or dream about, you deserve it." They have been particularly outspoken about racial equality, especially within the RuPaul's Drag Race fandom and drag community. In October 2018, Couleé interviewed The Vixen about racism in America for the UK's Black History Month edition of Gay Times. In another interview with Gay Times UK, Couleé discusses the importance of supporting and uplifting trans women of color.

Couleé has spoken against President Donald Trump. Specifically, in reaction to Trump's potential policy eliminating transgender recognition, they wrote:

Continuing their political activism, Couleé endorsed presidential candidate Elizabeth Warren, and spoke at Warren's DragCon NYC booth, encouraging people to vote for her in the 2020 United States presidential election. They also marched alongside Warren at the Las Vegas Pride Parade. In 2020, Couleé participated and spoke at the Drag March for Change in support for the Black Lives Matter movement.

Personal life
Merrell identifies as gay and non-binary, preferring singular they pronouns when out of drag and goes by she and her while in drag.

At one point, they suffered from bulimia. In 2018, Couleé received corrective dental surgery, something they had wanted since they were a teenager.

They have three drag daughters, Kenzie Couleé, Bambi-Banks Couleé, whom they adopted into their family in 2018, and Khloe Couleé, whom they publicly announced as their newest drag daughter on June 12, 2020. Shea, Kenzie, Bambi, and Khloe represent the current members of Shea's drag house, Maison Couleé.
They have named Naomi Campbell, Grace Jones, Beyoncé, Michael Jackson, Josephine Baker, Diana Ross, and Stevie Wonder as personal icons and influences.

Discography

Albums

EPs

Singles

As lead artist

As featured artist

Filmography

Movies

Television

Music videos

As lead artist

Featured and cameo roles

Internet series

Theatre

Awards and nominations

See also 
LGBT culture in Chicago

References

Citations

Audiovisual sources

External links

 
 
 

1989 births
Living people
20th-century LGBT people
21st-century American LGBT people
African-American drag queens
American anti-racism activists
American gay musicians
Gay entertainers
LGBT African Americans
LGBT people from Illinois
Non-binary musicians
Non-binary drag performers
People from Chicago
People from Plainfield, Illinois
Shea Couleé
Shea Couleé